A Joke of Destiny is a 1983 Italian comedy film directed by Lina Wertmüller. It was entered into the 14th Moscow International Film Festival.

Cast
 Ugo Tognazzi as On. Vincenzo De Andreiis
 Piera Degli Esposti as Maria Theresa De Andreiis
 Gastone Moschin as Ministro degli interni
 Roberto Herlitzka as Dr. Crisafulli, segretario
 Renzo Montagnani as Capitano Pautasso della DIGOS
 Enzo Jannacci as Gigi Pedrinelli, brigatista
 Valeria Golino as Adalgisa De Andreiis
 Massimo Wertmüller as Beniamino
 Pina Cei as Donna Sofia

References

External links
 

1983 films
1983 comedy films
Italian comedy films
1980s Italian-language films
Films directed by Lina Wertmüller
1980s Italian films